The southern maned sloth (Bradypus crinitus) is a three-toed sloth species.

Description 
The southern maned sloths have flatter skulls, rounder jaws, and wider cheekbones than the northern maned sloths. The species has a head that looks like a coconut.

Distribution 
The sloth is endemic to Brazil's Atlantic Forest, a highly biodiverse region. Southern maned sloths were found in Rio de Janeiro and Espirito Santo.

Discovery 
The species was discovered by John Edward Gray in 1850, but his assertions were later dismissed, with taxonomists agreeing that the specimen, that Gray described was a B. torquatus, but the new study proves that B. critinus does indeed exist. The B. crinitus separated from B. torquatus in the north by more than 4 million years of evolution.

Name 
The sloth received Gray's old name, Bradypus crinitus. The name crinitus means hairy, referring to its coconut-like head.

References 

Sloths
Mammals of Brazil
Endemic fauna of Brazil
Vulnerable species
Mammals described in 1850
Taxa named by John Edward Gray
Fauna of the Atlantic Forest